South Carolina Highway 34 Truck may refer to:

South Carolina Highway 34 Truck (Darlington), a truck route partially in Darlington
South Carolina Highway 34 Truck (Ridgeway), a truck route in Ridgeway

034 Truck
034 Truck